Nilambazar is a village located in Karimganj district in the Indian state of Assam. It is 329.9 kilometres south of the state capital Guwahati and 16.1 kilometres south of the district headquarters Karimganj.

Geography
It has an average elevation of 14 metres (46 feet).

Roadways      
Regular bus services connect Nilambazar with Guwahati, Shillong and Agartala via NH 8 (previously NH 44).

See also
Farampasha

References

Villages in Karimganj district